Plasmodium vacuolatum is a parasite of the genus Plasmodium.

Like all Plasmodium species P. vacuolatum has both vertebrate and insect hosts. The vertebrate hosts for this parasite are reptiles.

Description 

The parasite was first described by Telford in 1979. This species was previously regarded as Plasmodium tropiduri.

Geographical occurrence 

This species is found in Brazil, South America.

Clinical features and host pathology 

This species infects the tree runner lizard (Plica umbra)

References 

vacuolatum